Epistulae or Epistles are a specific genre of letter-writing composed in Latin. The term may also refer to specific works:

Epistulae (Pliny) (Letters), a collection of letters from Pliny the Younger
Epistles (Horace) (Letters), two books by Horace
The Epistles (Manichaeism), a Manichaean scriptural text
The Pauline epistles and the Catholic epistles of the Bible
Epistulae ex Ponto (Letters from the Black Sea), a work of Ovid
Epistulae Heroidum (Letters of Heroines), a collection of fifteen epistolary poems composed by Ovid
Epistulae Morales ad Lucilium (Moral Letters to Lucilius), a bundle of 124 letters by Seneca the Younger
Epistolæ Obscurorum Virorum (Letters of Obscure Men), a collection of satirical Latin letters which appeared in the 16th century in Germany

See also
Epistolary (disambiguation)